Year 151 (CLI) was a common year starting on Thursday (link will display the full calendar) of the Julian calendar. At the time, it was known as the Year of the Consulship of Condianus and Valerius (or, less frequently, year 904 Ab urbe condita). The denomination 151 for this year has been used since the early medieval period, when the Anno Domini calendar era became the prevalent method in Europe for naming years.

Events 
 By place 
 Asia 
 Mytilene and Smyrna are destroyed by an earthquake. 
 First year of Yuanjia of the Chinese Han Dynasty.
 By topic 
 Art 
 Detail from a rubbing of a stone relief in Wu family shrine (Wuliangci), Jiaxiang, Shandong, is made (Han dynasty).

Births 
 Annia Galeria Aurelia Faustina, daughter of Marcus Aurelius
 Zhong Yao, Chinese official and calligrapher (d. 230)

Deaths 
 Kanishka, Indian ruler of the Kushan Empire 
 Novatus, Christian saint (approximate date)

References